Quadricellariidae is a family of bryozoans belonging to the order Cheilostomatida.

Genera:
 Archimedes Lesueur, 1842
 Cellarinidra Canu & Bassler, 1927
 Curvacella Labracherie, 1970
 Dinomiscus
 Mediosola Labracherie, 1970
 Nellia Busk, 1852
 Nelliella Mawatari, 1974
 Quadricellaria d'Orbigny, 1851
 Vincularina d'Orbigny, 1851

References

Cheilostomatida